Spiris striata, the feathered footman, is a moth of the family Erebidae. The species was first described by Carl Linnaeus in his 1758 10th edition of Systema Naturae.

Description
Forewings are usually yellow or light yellow, with narrow longitudinal dark brown stripes in males, while in females the striations may be missing or restricted to the outer parts. Also hindwings are yellow, but they are darker and much wider than forewings and show a dark brown edge. The antennae of the males are pinnate. The caterpillars are hairy and black, with bright spots on the sides and a reddish-brown stripe on the back. The moths are diurnal and they fly May to August depending on the location.

The larvae feed on low vegetation and grasses, such as silver grass (Corynephorus spec.), fescue (Festuca spp.), heather (Calluna spp.), meadow sage (Salvia pratensis), hawkweed (Hieracium spp.) and mugwort (Artemisia spp.).

Distribution and habitat
This species can be found in Europe, Anatolia, Kazakhstan, Siberia and Mongolia (excluding eastern regions). The feathered footman prefers sunny, sandy, open areas with grass and herbaceous plants, rarely calcareous grasslands.

References

 Bisby F.A., Roskov Y.R., Orrell T.M., Nicolson D., Paglinawan L.E., Bailly N., Kirk P.M., Bourgoin T., Baillargeon G., Ouvrard D. (red.) (2011) Catalogue of Life

External links

"Coscinia striata (Linnaeus, 1758)". Moths and Butterflies of Europe and North Africa.
Coscinia striata on Fauna Europaea
Lepiforum e.V.
Insekten Box

Callimorphina
Moths described in 1758
Insects of Turkey
Moths of Europe
Taxa named by Carl Linnaeus